2-Methoxyestriol (2-MeO-E3) is an endogenous estrogen metabolite. It is specifically a metabolite of estriol and 2-hydroxyestriol. It has negligible affinity for the estrogen receptors and no estrogenic activity. However, 2-methoxyestriol does have some non-estrogen receptor-mediated cholesterol-lowering effects.

See also
 2-Methoxyestradiol
 2-Methoxyestrone
 4-Methoxyestradiol
 4-Methoxyestrone

References

Estranes
Ethers
Hypolipidemic agents
Human metabolites
Phenols
Sterols